Park Seong-rip (born 18 September 1973) is a South Korean handball player. He competed in the men's tournament at the 2000 Summer Olympics.

References

1973 births
Living people
South Korean male handball players
Olympic handball players of South Korea
Handball players at the 2000 Summer Olympics
Place of birth missing (living people)